"Landslide" is a song written by Stevie Nicks and performed by British-American rock band Fleetwood Mac. The song was first featured on the band's self-titled album Fleetwood Mac (1975). The original recording also appears on the compilation albums 25 Years – The Chain (1992) and The Very Best of Fleetwood Mac (2002), while a live version was released as a single 23 years later from the live reunion album The Dance (1997). "Landslide" reached  51 on the US Billboard Hot 100 chart and No. 10 on the Adult Contemporary chart. "Landslide" was certified Gold in October 2009 for sales of over 500,000 copies in the United States. According to Nielsen Soundscan, "Landslide" sold 2,093,186 copies in the United States as of 2017.

In 2021, the song was listed at No. 163 on Rolling Stone's "Top 500 Best Songs of All Time".

History
Nicks has said that she wrote the song while contemplating either going back to school or continuing on professionally with guitarist Lindsey Buckingham. Their album Buckingham Nicks had been dropped by Polydor Records before they could release a follow up. Nicks wrote the song while visiting Aspen, Colorado, sitting in someone's living room "looking out at the Rocky Mountains pondering the avalanche of everything that had come crashing down on us ... at that moment, my life truly felt like a landslide in many ways".

The song is one of Fleetwood Mac's most frequently performed during tours. Nicks has sung it on every Fleetwood Mac tour since joining the band, with the exception of the Shake the Cage tour, as well as on all of her own solo tours from 2005 onwards. A live performance of "Landslide" recorded on 27 June 1980, at the London Wembley Arena during the Tusk Tour was included on Live. Other live recordings of "Landslide" also appear on The Dance (1997), Live in Boston (2004), Crystal Visions – The Very Best of Stevie Nicks (2007) (with the Melbourne Symphony Orchestra), The Soundstage Sessions (2009), Soundstage, and the Live in Chicago DVD.

Personnel
 Stevie Nicks – vocals
 Lindsey Buckingham – guitars

Charts

Weekly charts

Year-end charts

Certifications

Cover versions

The Smashing Pumpkins

Alternative rock band the Smashing Pumpkins recorded an acoustic arrangement of the song that was featured as the B-side to their 1994 single "Disarm" and later on their B-side collection Pisces Iscariot.

The group's arrangement went on to be one of the rock band's most-beloved tracks and even had the approval of Nicks herself. As she told fans during a 1998 online chat with SonicNet, "There's nothing more pleasing to a songwriter than [someone else] doing one of their songs. ['Landslide'] also led me to being friends with Billy Corgan and the possibility that we'll work together," she said of the Smashing Pumpkins frontman. "Over this song, there's been this incredible connection ... he reached out ... I believe that my poetry is really meant for everyone, no matter what age."

The new version was a hit, making it to the top three on the Modern Rock Tracks chart in the United States that year and No. 30 on the US Airplay charts. The song was also featured on the US version of their greatest hits album Rotten Apples. It was later used in the TV show Alias on season 1 in the episode Page 47.

Charts

Dixie Chicks

American country music group the Dixie Chicks released a cover of "Landslide" on 26 August 2002 as the second single from their 2002 album, Home. Lead singer Natalie Maines said she was attracted to the song because she was then the same age that Nicks was when she first performed it. The band performed the song with Nicks at VH1 Divas Las Vegas in 2002. The music video for the song was directed by Jim Gable and edited by Scott C. Wilson.

This version, featuring the band's two- and three-part harmonies, reached the top 10 on the US Billboard Hot 100 and the Billboard Hot Country Songs chart. On the Billboard Adult Contemporary chart, it is the band's only number-one single. After Maines publicly criticised President George W. Bush and the imminent Allied invasion of Iraq, triggering a backlash, it fell to number 43 on the Billboard Hot 100 in one week and left the chart a week later.

Outside the United States, "Landslide" reached number two in Canada and became the band's only top-10 hit in Australia, where it reached number six. It was certified double platinum by the Recording Industry Association of America (RIAA) and triple platinum by the Australian Recording Industry Association (ARIA).

Charts

Certifications

Release history

Glee version
The cast of Fox Broadcasting Company's musical television program, Glee, performed the song in Season 2, Episode 15, "Sexy". Gwyneth Paltrow, Naya Rivera, and Heather Morris are featured on vocals for this version. Stevie Nicks attended the filming of the song and stated that it was a "beautiful mix" of the original and the Chicks version.

Other cover versions
 Antony Hegarty recorded the song for the tribute album Just Tell Me That You Want Me: A Tribute to Fleetwood Mac.
 Harry Styles performed this song with Nicks during his show at the Troubadour in May 2017.
 The Japanese House recorded a cover of this song for Spotify Singles, released 26 July 2017.
Parodied by Lucy Lawless (in character as Stevie Nicks) in 17 October 1998, episode of Saturday Night Live.
 On 12 March 2019, Australian pop singer Conrad Sewell recorded a cover of the song for Australian bank Westpac, in a campaign designed to target families dealing with separation and the resulting financial consequences. Branding in Asia described the rendition as "powerful", while The Music Networks Jake Challenor praised Sewell's performance as "soulful and emotionally charged".
 Gus Dapperton released a cover in 2022 to mark his signing to Warner Brothers Records.
 Brittany Snow (as "Bobby-Lynne") and Scott Mescudi (as "Jackson") performed a cover in the Ti West period slasher film X (2022), which is set in 1979, four years after the original song had been released.
 Stacey Kent released a cover version on her 2007 album Breakfast On The Morning Tram

See also
 List of Billboard Adult Contemporary number ones of 2003

References

External links

1970s ballads
1975 songs
1994 singles
2002 singles
American folk rock songs
British folk rock songs
The Chicks songs
Columbia Nashville Records singles
Monument Records singles
Fleetwood Mac songs
Folk ballads
Gwyneth Paltrow songs
Live singles
Music videos directed by Bruce Gowers
Reprise Records singles
Rock ballads
The Smashing Pumpkins songs
Song recordings produced by Billy Corgan
Song recordings produced by Keith Olsen
Song recordings produced by Lloyd Maines
Songs written by Stevie Nicks